Christian Debois   (June 27, 1882 – 1960) was a Danish composer.

See also
List of Danish composers

References
This article was initially translated from the Danish Wikipedia.

Danish composers
Male composers
1882 births
1960 deaths
20th-century male musicians